Friedrich Franz (1783–1860) was a photography pioneer and university teacher of Gregor Mendel.

Friedrich Franz (or Frederick Francis) was also the name of several members of the House of Mecklenburg-Schwerin:

Friedrich Franz I, Grand Duke of Mecklenburg-Schwerin (1756–1837)
Friedrich Franz II, Grand Duke of Mecklenburg-Schwerin (1823–1883)
Friedrich Franz III, Grand Duke of Mecklenburg-Schwerin (1851–1897)
Friedrich Franz IV, Grand Duke of Mecklenburg-Schwerin (1882–1945)
Friedrich Franz, Hereditary Grand Duke of Mecklenburg-Schwerin (1910–2001)

Frederick Francis may also refer to:
Frederick Francis (Australian politician) (1881–1949), member of the Australian House of Representatives
Frederick Francis (Canadian politician) (1845–1895), politician in Manitoba, Canada
Frederick Francis (architect) (1818–1896), British architect of St Elphin's Church, Warrington